Black Holes is the debut studio album by Canadian blues rock band, The Blue Stones. The album was released on October 20, 2015. The album was re-released on October 26, 2018 through Entertainment One.

Music videos 
The first music video released was "Black Holes (Solid Ground)" which was re-released as a music video on November 27, 2018 through Billboard.

Track listing

Personnel 
The following were credited for the album.

 The Blue Stones – composer, liner notes, producer
 Ian Blurton – engineer, producer
 Eric Boulanger – mastering
 Adam Hawkins – mixing
 Dave Houle – artwork
 Brett Humber – engineer, producer
 Joseph McCarthy – package layout
 George Cappellini Jr. - A&R
 Eddie Laureno - A&R

References

External links 
 

2018 debut albums
The Blue Stones albums
MNRK Music Group albums